William Hornby Davies (1873–1929) was an English footballer who played in the Football League for Bolton Wanderers.

References

1873 births
1929 deaths
English footballers
Association football midfielders
English Football League players
Bolton Wanderers F.C. players
Bedminster F.C. players
Bristol Rovers F.C. players